The Heckler & Koch HK416 is a gas-operated assault rifle chambered for the 5.56×45mm NATO cartridge. It is designed and manufactured by the German company Heckler & Koch.

Although the design is based on the AR-15 class of firearm (specifically the Colt M4 carbine family issued to the U.S. military), it uses a proprietary short-stroke, gas piston system from Heckler & Koch's earlier G36 family of rifles.

The HK416 is the standard assault rifle of the Norwegian Armed Forces and the United States Marine Corps (named M27), and it has been selected by the French Armed Forces to replace the FAMAS. Other users of the HK416 include the German Army and the Irish Army Ranger Wing, as well as the US Navy's SEAL Team Six, who used it to kill Osama Bin Laden in 2011.

History 
The United States Army's Delta Force, at the request of R&D NCO Larry Vickers, collaborated with Heckler & Koch to develop a new carbine in the 1990s for use in close quarters combat. At this point, they were equipped with the Heckler & Koch MP5, whose 9 mm bullet was considered too weak, and the M4 Carbine, which was considered too large. During development, Heckler & Koch capitalized on experience gained developing the Bundeswehrs Heckler & Koch G36 assault rifle, the U.S. Army's XM8 rifle project (cancelled in 2005) and the British Armed Forces SA80 A2 upgrade programme. The project was originally called the Heckler & Koch M4, but this was changed in response to a trademark infringement suit filed by Colt Defense.

Delta Force replaced its M4s with the HK416D in March 2005, after tests revealed that the piston operating system significantly reduces malfunctions while increasing the life of parts. The HK416 has been tested by the United States military and is in use with some law enforcement agencies. It has been adopted as the standard rifle of the Norwegian Armed Forces (2008) and the French Armed Forces (2017) and is used by many special operations units worldwide.

A modified variant underwent testing by the United States Marine Corps as the M27 Infantry Automatic Rifle (IAR). After the Marine Corps Operational Test & Evaluation Activity supervised a round of testing at MCAGCC Twentynine Palms, Fort McCoy, and Camp Shelby (for dust, cold-weather, and hot-weather conditions, respectively). As of March 2012, fielding of 452 IARs had been completed of 4,748 ordered. Five infantry battalions: 1st Light Armored Reconnaissance Battalion and 2nd Battalion, 4th Marines, out of Camp Pendleton; 1st Battalion, 3rd Marines, out of Marine Corps Base Hawaii; 1st Battalion, 9th Marines, out of Camp Lejeune; and 1st Battalion, 25th Marines, out of Fort Devens deployed the weapon. In December 2017, the Marine Corps revealed a decision to equip every Marine in an infantry squad with the M27.

Design 

The HK416 uses a HK-proprietary short-stroke gas piston system that derives from the HK G36, forgoing the direct gas-impingement system action that is standard in AR-15 rifles. The HK G36 gas system was in turn partially derived from the AR-18 assault rifle designed in 1963. The HK system uses a short-stroke piston driving an operating rod to force the bolt carrier to the rear. This design prevents combustion gases from entering the weapon's interior—a shortcoming with direct impingement systems. The reduction in heat and fouling of the bolt carrier group increases the reliability of the weapon and extends the interval between stoppages. During factory tests the HK416 fired 10,000 rounds in full-auto without malfunctioning. The HK416's piston system was originally self-regulating in theory, but in the default position tends to give increased recoil over an adjustable gas system. A user adjustable gas regulator was added in later variants.

The HK416 is equipped with a proprietary accessory rail forearm with MIL-STD-1913 rails on all four sides. This lets most current accessories for M4/M16-type weapons fit the HK416. The HK416 rail forearm can be installed and removed without tools by using the bolt locking lug as the screwdriver. The rail forearm is "free-floating" and does not contact the barrel, improving accuracy.

The HK416 has an adjustable multi-position telescopic butt stock, offering six different lengths of pull. The shoulder pad can be either convex or concave and the stock features a storage space for maintenance accessories, spare electrical batteries or other small kit items. It can also be switched out for other variations like Magpul stocks.

The HK416's barrel is cold hammer-forged with a 20,000-round service life and features a 6 grooves 178 mm (7 in) right hand twist. The cold hammer-forging process provides a stronger barrel for greater safety in case of an obstructed bore or for extended firing sessions. Modifications for an over-the-beach (OTB) capability such as drainage holes in the bolt carrier and buffer system are available to let the HK416 fire safely as quickly as possible after being submerged in liquids like water. To reduce the risk of slam-firing, the HK416 features a proprietary firing pin safety in the bolt. This firing pin safety limits the HK416 upper to working with standard AR-15 type full height hammers in the fire control group of the lower.

Adoption 

In July 2007, the U.S. Army announced a limited competition between the M4 carbine, FN SCAR, HK416, and the previously-shelved HK XM8. Ten examples of each of the four competitors were involved. Each weapon fired 60,000 rounds in an extreme dust environment. The shoot-off was for assessing future needs, not to select a replacement for the M4. The XM8 scored the best, with only 127 stoppages in 60,000 total rounds, the FN SCAR Light had 226 stoppages, while the HK416 had 233 stoppages. The M4 carbine scored "significantly worse" than the rest of the field with 882 stoppages. However, magazine failures caused 239 of the M4's 882 failures. Army officials said, in December 2007, that the new magazines could be combat-ready by spring of 2008 if testing went well.

In December 2009, a modified version of the HK416 was selected for the final testing in the Infantry Automatic Rifle program, designed to partially replace the M249 light machine gun at the squad level for the United States Marine Corps. It beat the three other finalists by FN Herstal and Colt Defense. In July 2010, the HK416 IAR was designated as the M27 and 450 were procured for additional testing.

The Turkish company Makina ve Kimya Endustrisi Kurumu ("Mechanical and Chemical Industry Corporation") has considered manufacturing a copy of the HK416 as the MKEK Mehmetçik-1 for the Turkish Armed Forces. Instead, the new MPT-76 rifle has been developed by KALEKALIP with MKEK as the producer, with the Mehmetçik-1 dropped from adoption into the Turkish military.

The French Armed Forces conducted a rifle evaluation and trial to replace the FAMAS, and selected the HK416F as its primary firearm in 2016. Of the 93,080 rifles, 54,575 will be a "short" version with a  barrel weighing  without the ability to use a grenade launcher, and 38,505 will be a "standard" version with a  barrel weighing , of which 14,915 will take FÉLIN attachments; standard rifles will be supplied with 10,767 HK269F grenade launchers. 5,000 units are supposed to be delivered in 2017, half of the order delivered by 2022, and the order fulfilled by 2028. The first batch of 400 rifles was delivered on 3 May 2017.

The HK416 was one of the weapons displayed to U.S. Army officials during an invitation-only Industry Day on 13 November 2008. The goal of the Industry Day was to review current carbine technology prior to writing formal requirements for a future replacement for the M4 carbine. The HK416 was then an entry in the Individual Carbine competition to replace the M4. The weapon submitted was known as the HK416 A5. The Individual Carbine competition was cancelled before a winning weapon was chosen.

Variants

HK416 

The HK416 chambered for 5.56×45mm NATO is offered in multiple barrel lengths available to the military and law enforcement market only.

D10RS: sub-compact with a 264 mm (10.4 in) barrel
D14.5RS (D145RS): carbine 368 mm (14.5 in) barrel
D16.5RS (D165RS): rifle with 419 mm (16.5 in) barrel
D20RS: full-sized rifle 508 mm (20 in) barrel
The HK416C "C" for Compact is an ultra-compact version that only remained as a prototype and never went to full production. It was submitted for the Ultra Compact Individual Weapon contract but lost to the LWRC M6A2.

The M27 Infantry Automatic Rifle is a squad automatic weapon variant developed from the D16.5RS, adopted in 2011 by the United States Marine Corps. In 2018 the USMC decided to adopt the M27 IAR as their infantry standard service rifle.

HK416 A5 
The HK416 A5 is an improved variant that was first seen in the Individual Carbine competition. It features a stock similar to that of the G28 designated marksman rifle, except slimmer and non-adjustable. The rifle features an improved tool-less adjustable gas regulator for suppressor use, which can accommodate barrel lengths down to  without modifications. It also features a redesigned lower receiver with ambidextrous fire controls, optimised magazine and ammunition compatibility, a repair kit housed inside the pistol grip, and a Flat Dark Earth color scheme. The stock has a fixed buttplate and no longer has a storage space, as well as the sling loops removed from it. The V2 HK Battle grip is incorporated, which has the V2 grip profile with the storage compartment of the V1 grip for tools. The handguard uses a new hexagonal-shaped cross bolt that cannot be removed by the bolt locking lugs but instead by the takedown tool housed inside the grip. It has a "heavy duty castle nut", which is more robust than the previous version, therefore making that weak spot more resistant to impact.

As of 2013, Heckler & Koch replaced the original HK416 with the A5 variant.
HK416 A5 – 11": sub-compact with a 279 mm (11.0 in) barrel
HK416 A5 – 14.5": carbine 368 mm (14.5 in) barrel
HK416 A5 – 16.5": rifle with 419 mm (16.5 in) barrel
HK416 A5 – 20": full-sized rifle 508 mm (20 in) barrel

HK416 A7 
The HK416 A7 is designed for the German KSK and KSM, (designated as G95). A new safety selector has been installed, which rotates 45 degrees rather than 90 degrees as on the M16/M4/AR standard safety selectors. The new configuration of the selector is comparable to those of aftermarket 45-degree safety selectors. The HK416 A7 also features a KeyMod Rail System, which is more lightweight than the traditional Picatinny Rail Systems.

HK416 A8 
In March 2021, the German Federal Ministry of Defence announced the adoption of the HK416 A8 to supersede the G36 as the standard rifle of the German Armed Forces. The HK416 A8 is similar to the HK416 A7, but it features a height-adjustable shoulder support on the stock, a steeper grip angle as well as a shorter hand guard to comply with the required maximum weight of  according to the tender. According to the Federal Procurement Office (BAAINBw Federal Office for Equipment, Information Technology and Use of the Bundeswehr) the Bundeswehr will receive the weapon designated as G95A1 as the new standard rifle. The Kurz or short barrelled version for "specialized forces" will be designated as G95KA1.

Civilian variants 
Civilian variants of the HK416 and HK417 introduced in 2007 were known as MR223 and MR308 (as they remain known in Europe). Both are semi-automatic rifles with several "sporterized" features. At the 2009 SHOT Show, these two firearms were introduced to the U.S. civilian market renamed respectively MR556 and MR762. There is another variant of the MR556 called the MR556A1, which is an improved version of the former. It was created with input from American special forces units. The MR556A1 lets the upper receiver attach to any M16/M4/AR-15 family lower receiver, as the receiver take-down pins are in the same standard location. The original concept for the MR556 did not allow for this, as the take-down pins were located in a "non-standard" location. The MR223 maintains the "non-standard" location of the pins, disallowing attachment of the upper receiver to the lower receivers of any other M16/M4/AR-15 family of rifles.

As of 2012, the MR556A1 upper receiver group fits standard AR-15 lower receivers without modification, and functions reliably with standard STANAG magazines. HK-USA sells a variant under the MR556A1 Competition Model nomenclature; it comes with a 14.5" free-float Modular Rail System (MRS), 16.5" barrel, OSS compensator and Magpul CTR buttstock. The firearm's precision is specified as 1 MOA by Heckler & Koch. In Europe, the MR223A3 variant is sold with the same cosmetic and ergonomical improvements of the HK416A5. The French importer of Heckler & Koch in France, RUAG Defence, have announced that they are going to sell two civilian versions of the HK416F, named the MR223 F-S (14.5" Standard version) and MR223 F-C (11" Short version).

Users

See also 
 Heckler & Koch HK417
 Haenel MK 556
 List of assault rifles
 List of carbines
 M16 rifle
 Beretta ARX160
 IWI Tavor
 QBZ-95
 QBZ-191
 SA80
 Steyr AUG
 FN SCAR

References

External links 

 
 2008 Heckler & Koch Military and LE brochure

5.56×45mm NATO assault rifles
Short stroke piston firearms
Modular firearms
416
Post–Cold War weapons of Germany
Police weapons
ArmaLite AR-10 derivatives
AR-15 style rifles
Weapons and ammunition introduced in 2004